The Samuel Dexter House is a historic house at 699 High Street, Dedham, Massachusetts. It was built, beginning in July 1761, by Samuel Dexter, a member of the Massachusetts Provincial Congress. Dexter purchased the property on which the house stands on March 18, 1761. The house was next door to the parsonage of the First Church and Parish in Dedham, where he grew up. The house was the childhood home of the Secretary of the Treasury Samuel Dexter.

The house served as the headquarters of General George Washington for a night following the evacuation of Boston. Washington paid £9.18.7 for use of the home on April 4 to 5, 1776. Dexter had retired to Connecticut by this point, but his fellow Governor's Councilor Joshua Henshaw was living at the house. The house also contained all but two books of records from the Suffolk County Registry of Deeds. They had been removed from Boston to protect them during the military occupation of the capital.

The building was remodeled in 1901 following the design of J. Harleston Parker, using Colonial revival elements. The Samuel Dexter House is a contributing property to the Dedham Village Historic District, added to the National Register of Historic Places in September 2006.

See also
List of Washington's Headquarters during the Revolutionary War
National Register of Historic Places listings in Norfolk County, Massachusetts
Old Village Cemetery
Fairbanks House (Dedham, Massachusetts)

References

Works cited

Buildings and structures in Dedham, Massachusetts
History of Dedham, Massachusetts
Houses in Norfolk County, Massachusetts
Historic district contributing properties in Massachusetts
National Register of Historic Places in Norfolk County, Massachusetts
1761 establishments in Massachusetts